Broadcast coverage of the 2010 Winter Olympics aired on the radio and television services listed below.

Within the host Vancouver-Whistler area, coverage was available on CIVT-TV (CTV), KING-TV (NBC), CHNM-TV (Omni), and most of the Canadian cable channels listed in the below table.

References 

Broadcasters
2010 Winter Olympics broadcasters
2010 Winter Olympics broadcasters
2010 Winter Olympics broadcasters
2010 Winter Olympics broadcasters